Boston is a town in Erie County, New York, United States. The population was 8,023 at the 2010 census. The town is named after Boston, Massachusetts.

Boston is an interior town of the county and one of the county's "Southtowns".  Boston is southeast of Buffalo.

History

The Iroquois, under various names, lived here until the European immigrants became predominant.

In 1804, brothers Charles and Oliver Johnson and their families became the area's first settlers. The first Christian church was the Free Will Baptist Church, founded circa 1811. On April 5, 1817, the town of Boston was formed from a portion of the town of Eden. The first post office opened in 1832 on the north side of town.

In 1843, the town suffered an epidemic (28 of the 43 residents were affected, 10 of whom died) believed to be typhoid fever, possibly from a local well.

This town has much history that can be found on the headstones in the cemetery across from the Boston Town Hall. There are many old gravestones that show some of the first settlers in the town and the infamous "Love" murder.

Geography

Geologically speaking, Boston is one of the more interesting places in the Greater Niagara region, for many glacial activities, over  many years, caused sufficient pressure indentation to alter dramatically the landscape and even the water table.

U.S. Route 219 crosses the town. New York State Route 277 (Boston State Road/Herman Hill Road) intersects New York State Route 391 (Boston State Road) in the northwestern part of the town at North Boston.

Demographics

As of the census of 2000, there were 7,897 people, 2,997 households, and 2,244 families residing in the town.  The population density was 220.4 people per square mile (85.1/km2).  There were 3,122 housing units at an average density of 87.1 per square mile (33.6/km2).  The racial makeup of the town was 98.91% white, 0.14% African American, 0.14% Native American, 0.20% Asian, 0.01% Pacific Islander, 0.10% from other races, and 0.49% from two or more races. Hispanic or Latino of any race were 0.72% of the population.

There were 2,997 households, out of which 33.3% had children under the age of 18 living with them, 64.6% were married couples living together, 7.0% had a female householder with no husband present, and 25.1% were non-families. 20.6% of all households were made up of individuals, and 8.8% had someone living alone who was 65 years of age or older.  The average household size was 2.63 and the average family size was 3.06.

In the town, the population was spread out, with 25.2% under the age of 18, 6.3% from 18 to 24, 28.7% from 25 to 44, 27.1% from 45 to 64, and 12.7% who were 65 years of age or older.  The median age was 40 years. For every 100 females, there were 100.8 males.  For every 100 females age 18 and over, there were 98.2 males.

The median income for a household in the town was $48,315, and the median income for a family was $57,714. Males had a median income of $42,101 versus $27,798 for females. The per capita income for the town was $21,303.  About 3.6% of families and 5.9% of the population were below the poverty line, including 8.0% of those under age 18 and 4.5% of those age 65 or over.

Communities and locations in Boston
Boston – A hamlet in the southern part of the town on Boston State Road, NY-391. The community was once called "Boston Corners" and "Torrey Corners".
Creekside – A location by the northern town line, north of North Boston.
East Boston Hill – A location near the eastern town line.
Eighteen Mile Creek – A stream that flows northward through the town.
North Boston – The hamlet of North Boston, located by the northern town line.
Patchin – A hamlet located near the town's center on the Boston State Road. The community was once known as "Boston Center". It was named after Talcott Patchin, a tanner.
Ski Tamarack – A former skiing location in the northeastern corner of the town.

Notable people
Charles Miller, commander of the organization now known as the 28th Infantry Division and founder of the Galena-Signal Oil Company, which became part of the Standard Oil combine, and then part of the corporation now known as Texaco.
Joseph C. Sibley, U.S. representative from Pennsylvania
A. Chapin Whiting, member of the Wisconsin State Assembly
Ellen Beach Yaw, coloratura soprano, born in Boston in 1869.

References

External links
 Town of Boston official website
 Boston NY website
  Boston, NY history
  Boston Forest

Buffalo–Niagara Falls metropolitan area
Towns in Erie County, New York